Khaled Ghaloum (born 18 January 1958) is a Kuwaiti athlete. He competed in the men's hammer throw at the 1980 Summer Olympics.

References

1958 births
Living people
Athletes (track and field) at the 1980 Summer Olympics
Kuwaiti male hammer throwers
Olympic athletes of Kuwait
Place of birth missing (living people)